Paul Cézanne University (also referred to as Paul Cézanne University Aix-Marseille III; French: Université Paul Cézanne Aix-Marseille III) was a public research university based in the heart of Provence (south east of France), in both Aix-en-Provence and Marseille. It was one of the three Universities of Aix-Marseille and was part of the Academy of Aix and Marseille. Its weight was considerable in the French university landscape. The university bore the name of Paul Cézanne, a prominent French artist and Post-Impressionist painter, who attended its law school from 1858 to 1861.

The university was founded on 9 December 1409 as a studium generale by Louis II of Anjou, Count of Provence, and subsequently recognized by papal bull issued by Pope Alexander V. It enrolled 22,500 students, including more than 3,000 international students from 128 different countries. It was a multidisciplinary university offering a range of more than 210 national diploma programmes and 150 university degrees in the humanities, law, political science, economics, management, environmental studies, and science and technology.

On 1 January 2012 it merged with the University of Provence and the University of the Mediterranean to become Aix-Marseille University, the youngest, but also the largest in terms of students, budgets and staff in France.

Activity 
The University of Aix-Marseille III had an established reputation as one of the oldest and most respected academic institutions in France. Many prominent government leaders have studied at the university's Institute of Political Studies (Institut d'études politiques d'Aix-en-Provence), which is now associated with Aix-Marseille University. Established in 1956, it is one of a network of 9 world-famous IEPs (Instituts d’Etudes Politiques) in France. The IEP is a Grande école in political science and its primary aim is to train senior executives for the public, semi-public, and private sectors. Although the IEP offers a multitude of disciplines, its main focus is on politics, including related subjects such as history, law, economics, languages, international relations, and media studies.

The law school at Paul Cézanne University, which is currently part of Aix-Marseille University, dates back to the university's foundation in 1409. The school had far-reaching influence, since written law, which in France originated in Aix-en-Provence, spread from there, eventually replacing the common law practiced throughout the rest of Northern Gaul. It is one of the largest law schools in France today, and is considered to be one of the nation's leading centres for legal research and teaching. The school is unique among French law schools for the breadth of courses offered and the extent of research undertaken in a wide range of fields. Other than Panthéon-Assas University, the school has attracted the most prestigious law faculty in France. The teaching faculty comprises 155 professors and 172 adjunct lecturers, the latter drawn from private practice, the civil service, the judiciary and other organizations.  Much of the legal research at the university is done under the auspices of its many research institutes – there is one in almost every field of law. Research activity is buttressed by a network of libraries. The university library holds an impressive collection of monographs and periodicals, including an important collection of sixteenth century manuscripts. Moreover, the libraries have several specialized rooms dedicated to specific fields of law, in particular in International and European Law and Legal Theory.

The university's Institute of Business Administration (Institut d'Administration des Entreprises), commonly known as IAE Aix-en-Provence, now part of Aix-Marseille University, was the first Graduate School of Management in the French public university system. IAE Aix is "a prestigious, double-accredited institution, with an international approach to business combining both classic and innovative teaching methods", according to The Independent. The school offers graduate level programmes in general management, international management, internal audit of organisations, service management, internal and external communications management, management and information technologies, international financial management and applied marketing. In 2011, the MSc in General Management was ranked 2nd in France along with the MSc in Services Management and Marketing being ranked 3rd and the MSc in Audit and Corporate Governance also being ranked 3rd in the country by SMBG. In 1990, IAE Aix and the École supérieure des sciences économiques et commerciales (ESSEC) signed an agreement to unite and offer a joint Doctorate Programme, allowing ESSEC professors to teach in the Research Oriented Master programme in Aix-en-Provence. Furthermore, after Research Oriented Master graduation, students can attend the ESSEC Doctorate seminars and have an ESSEC Research Advisor (Directeur de Recherche). In the same way, ESSEC students can enroll in the IAE Aix's Research Oriented Master and Doctorate programmes. In both cases, the members of the thesis juries come from both IAE Aix and ESSEC. The Doctorate title is awarded by Aix-Marseille University.

The total budget volume of the university was equal to 44.93 m €. This amount did not include the civil servant salaries that were directly paid by the Trésor public. There were 1,329 civil servants including 678 faculty members. Their salaries roughly amounted to the initial budget figure to give a total budget of 100 m €. The university was split in 16 sites located in five cities. The overall area occupied by the university was equal to 225,000 square meters.

Organization

There were eight major components in the University of Aix-Marseille III which benefited from financial autonomy:

Faculty of Law and Political Science
Aix-en-Provence, Schuman
Aix-en-Provence, Poncet
Aix-en-Provence, Montperrin
Arles, Espace Van Gogh
Marseille, Space Canebière
Faculty of Applied Economics
Aix-en-Provence, Schuman
Aix-en-Provence, Forbin
Marseille, Canebière
Faculty of Science and Technology
Aix-en-Provence, Montperrin
Marseille, Saint-Jérôme
Marseille, Europôle of Arbois
Institute of Business Administration – IAE Aix
Puyricard, Clos Guiot
Institute of French Studies for Foreign Students
Aix-en-Provence, Cours Gambetta
Institute of Public Management and Territorial Governance
Aix-en-Provence, Gaston de Saporta
Marseille, Liberation
University Institute of Technology
Marseille, Saint-Jérôme
Institute of Political Studies – Sciences Po Aix
Aix-en-Provence, Gaston de Saporta

Alumni 

Jean Aicard – a French poet, dramatist and novelist
Paul Alexis – a French novelist, dramatist and journalist
Joseph d'Arbaud – a French poet
Fanny Ardant – a French actress, winner of the César Award for Best Actress
Isabelle Arvers – a French media art curator, critic and author, specializing in video and computer games, web animation, digital cinema, retrogaming, chip tunes and machinima
Ali Bach Hamba – a Tunisian lawyer, journalist and politician
Édouard Balladur – Prime Minister of France: 1993–1995; Minister of the Economy, Finance and Privatization of France: 1986–1988
Charles Jean Marie Barbaroux – a French politician of the Revolutionary period
Victor Barthélemy – a French political activist
Dominique Bénard – former Deputy Secretary-General of the World Organization of the Scout Movement (WOSM)
Léon de Berluc-Pérussis – a French poet and historian
Carole Bienaimé – a French film and television producer 
Roland Blum – a French conservative politician, member of the National Assembly of France and member of the Union for a Popular Movement (UMP)
Philippe Bourguignon – Member of the Board of Directors of eBay, former co-Chief Executive Officer of the World Economic Forum (WEF)
Valérie Boyer – Member of the National Assembly of France
Marcel Brion – a French essayist, literary critic, novelist and historian
Emmanuel Brunet Jailly – a Canadian politics and public policy scholar
Marie-Arlette Carlotti – Member of the European Parliament
René Cassin – the French Minister of Justice: 1941–1943; President of the European Court of Human Rights (ECtHR): 1965–1968; the 1968 Nobel Peace Prize Laureate
Paul Cézanne – a French artist and Post-Impressionist painter
Zouheir Chokr – President of the Lebanese University, former Lebanese Ambassador to Qatar
Jürgen Chrobog – the German Ambassador to the United States: 1995–2001
Raphaël Confiant – a French writer
Adolphe Crémieux – the French Minister of Justice: 1848; 1870–1871
Gaston Crémieux – a French lawyer, journalist and writer
Gaston Defferre – Minister of the Interior of France: 1981–1984; Mayor of Marseille: 1944–1946; 1953–1986
Thomas Degos – the Prefect of Mayotte: 2011–present
Alexandre del Valle – an Italo-French political scientist and geopolitician
Blaise Diagne – a French political leader, the first black African elected to the National Assembly of France
Pape Diouf – President of Olympique de Marseille: 2005–2009
Émile Eddé – President of Lebanon: 1936–1941; 1943; Prime Minister of Lebanon: 1929–1930
Toussaint-Bernard Émeric-David – a French archaeologist and writer on art
Roland Eng – Advisor to the Cambodian Government and Ambassador-at-Large
Bruno Étienne – a French sociologist and political analyst
Roger Excoffon – a French graphic designer
Charles Annibal Fabrot – a French jurisconsult
Pierre Falcone – a French businessman, the Chairman of Pierson Capital Group
Christopher Fomunyoh – Senior Associate for Africa and Regional Director at the National Democratic Institute for International Affairs (NDI)
José Frèches – a French historical novelist
Thomas Galbraith, 2nd Baron Strathclyde, PC – a British politician, the Leader of the House of Lords, the Chancellor of the Duchy of Lancaster, and the Leader of the Conservative Party in the House of Lords
Romain Gary – a French diplomat, novelist, film director and World War II aviator
Antoine Marc Gaudin – a professor at the Massachusetts Institute of Technology (MIT), and a founding member of the National Academy of Engineering (NAE)
Jean-Pierre Gibert – a French Canon lawyer
Félix Gouin – President of the Provisional Government of the French Republic: 1946; Co-Prince of Andorra: 1946; President of the Constituent National Assembly of France: 1945–1946
Sylvie Goulard – Member of the European Parliament
Élisabeth Guigou – the French Minister of Justice: 1997–2000; the French Minister of Social Affairs: 2000–2002
Malek Haddad – an Algerian poet and writer
Peter Hambro – founder of Peter Hambro Mining and a Non-Executive Director of the Private Banking Division of Société Générale
Maryse Joissains-Masini – Member of the National Assembly of France; Mayor of Aix-en-Provence: 2001–present
Sophie Joissains – a French politician and a member of the Senate of France
Pravind Jugnauth – Vice Prime Minister of Mauritius: 2010–2011; Minister of Finance of Mauritius: 2003–2005; 2009–2011
Sébastien Jumel – a French politician, member of the French Communist Party (PCF)
Roger Karoutchi – the French Ambassador to the Organisation for Economic Co-operation and Development (OECD): 2009–present
Vasil Kolarov – Provisional President of Bulgaria: 1946–1947; Prime Minister of Bulgaria: 1949–1950
Mamadou Koulibaly – President of the National Assembly of Côte d'Ivoire: 2001–present
Christine Lagarde – Managing Director of the International Monetary Fund (IMF): 2011–present; Minister of the Economy, Industry and Employment of France: 2007–2011
Luzolo Bambi Lessa - Minister of Justice of the Democratic Republic of the Congo: 2008–present
Raphaël Liogier – Director of the Observatoire du religieux
Jean-Charles Marchiani – a French prefect and politician
Jean-François Mattéi – a French philosopher
Kenneth H. Merten – an American diplomat and the current United States Ambassador to Haiti
Paul Meurisse – a French actor
François Mignet – a French journalist and historian
Stoyan Mihaylovski – a Bulgarian writer and social figure
Honoré Gabriel Riqueti, comte de Mirabeau – President of the National Constituent Assembly of France: 1791
Frédéric Mistral – a French writer, winner of the 1904 Nobel Prize in Literature
Iulia Motoc – Judge at the European Court of Human Rights, former Member of the United Nations Human Rights Committee, former judge of the Constitutional Court of Romania
Prince Norodom Ranariddh – the second son of former king Norodom Sihanouk of Cambodia and a half-brother of the current king Norodom Sihamoni
Patrick Ollier – President of the National Assembly of France: 2007; Vice-President of the National Assembly of France: 1998–2002
Joseph Louis Elzéar Ortolan – a French jurist and former Chair of Comparative Criminal Law at the Sorbonne University
Philip M. Parker – INSEAD Chaired Professor of Management Science
Benoît Pelletier – Minister of Canadian Intergovernmental Affairs: 2003–2008; Leader of the Government in Parliament: 2007–2008
Terry Phillips – a journalist, author and media consultant
Richard Pollock – a Canadian lawyer and politician
Jean-Étienne-Marie Portalis – a French jurist and politician in time of the French Revolution and the First Empire
François Juste Marie Raynouard – a French dramatist and academic
André de Richaud – a French poet and writer
Didier Robert – Member of the National Assembly of France
Maurice Rouvier – Prime Minister of France: 1887; 1905–1906; Minister of Foreign Affairs of France: 1905–1906
Ambroise Roux-Alphéran – a French historian
Nicolas Schmit – Minister of Labour, Employment and Immigration of Luxembourg: 2009–present
Philippe Séguin – President of the National Assembly of France: 1993–1997; President of the Court of Financial Auditors of France: 2004–2010
Roland Theis – the General Secretary of the Christian Democrat Union in Saarland, Germany
Adolphe Thiers – 2nd President of France: 1871–1873; Co-Prince of Andorra: 1871–1873; Minister of the Interior of France: Oct–Dec 1832; Apr–Nov 1834; 1834–1836; Minister of Foreign Affairs of France: Feb–Sep 1836; Mar–Oct 1840; Prime Minister of France: Feb–Sep 1836; Mar–Oct 1840
Dominique Tian – Member of the National Assembly of France
Jean-Louis Trintignant – a French actor, winner of the Best Actor Award at the Cannes Film Festival
Richard Tuheiava – Member of the Senate of France
Colin Tyre, Lord Tyre CBE – a Scottish lawyer, former President of the Council of Bars and Law Societies of Europe, and a Senator of the College of Justice, a judge of the Supreme Courts of Scotland
Albert Jan van den Berg – the Arbitration Chair at Erasmus University Rotterdam and the President of the Netherlands Arbitration Institute
Fernando José de França Dias Van-Dúnem – Prime Minister of Angola: 1991–1992; 1996–1999; President of the National Assembly of Angola: 1992–1996
Nicolas Vatomanga – a saxophonist, flutist, bandleader and composer
Jens Weidmann – 8th President of the Deutsche Bundesbank: 2011–present; Member of the Governing Council of the European Central Bank (ECB): 2011–present; Governor of the International Monetary Fund (IMF): 2011–present

Notable faculty 
Sami A. Aldeeb – Head of the Arab and Islamic Law Department at the Swiss Institute of Comparative Law, and Director of the Center of Arab and Islamic Law
Renato Balduzzi – Minister of Health of Italy: 2011–present
Boudewijn Bouckaert – a Belgian law professor, a member of the Flemish Movement, and a libertarian conservative thinker and politician
Sadok Chaabane – Minister of Justice of Tunisia: 1992–1997; Minister of Higher Education and Scientific Research of Tunisia: 1999–2004
Barry E. Friedman – an American academic with an expertise in federal courts, working at the intersections of law, politics and history
Bernard Harcourt –   the Chair of the Political Science Department, professor of political science and the Julius Kreeger Professor of Law at the University of Chicago
Ayşe Işıl Karakaş – a Turkish academic, judge of the European Court of Human Rights (ECtHR)
Jean-Louis Le Moigne – a French specialist on systems theory and constructivist epistemology
Leonard Liggio – a classical liberal author, research professor of law at George Mason University, and executive vice president of the Atlas Economic Research Foundation in Fairfax, Virginia
John Loughlin – Director of the Von Hügel Institute, and a Senior Fellow and Affiliated Lecturer in the Department of Politics and International Studies at the University of Cambridge
Ejan Mackaay – Professor of Law at the Université de Montréal
Joseph Jérôme, Comte Siméon – Minister of the Interior of France: 1820–1821; President of the Court of Financial Auditors of France: 1837–1839
Ronald Sokol – an American lawyer and writer
William H. Starbuck – an organizational scientist who held professorships in social relations (Johns Hopkins University), sociology (Cornell University), business administration (University of Wisconsin–Milwaukee), and management (New York University)
Rafał Taubenschlag – a Polish historian of law, a specialist in Roman law and papyrology
Michael Tigar – an American criminal defense attorney
Michel van den Abeele – a former Director-General of the European Commission
Philippe Van Parijs – a Belgian philosopher and political economist
John Waterbury – an American academic, professor of politics and international affairs at Princeton University's Woodrow Wilson School of Public and International Affairs

Presidents 
1973–1977: Charles Debbasch
1977–1982: Louis Favoreu
1982–1994: Lucien Capella
1994–1999: Christian Louit
1999–2000: Gilbert Peiffer
2000–2005: Jacques Bourdon
2005–2008: Philippe Tchamitchian
2008–2011: Marc Pena

References

External links 
  Aix-Marseille University
 Université de Provence Aix-Marseille I
 Université de la Méditerranée Aix-Marseille II
 Université Paul Cézanne Aix-Marseille III
 Faculty of Law and Political Science
 Faculty of Applied Economics
 Faculty of Science and Technology
 Institute of Business Administration – IAE Aix
 Institute of French Studies for Foreign Students
 Institute of Public Management and Territorial Governance
 University Institute of Technology
 Institute of Political Studies – Sciences Po Aix

 
Defunct universities and colleges in France
Aix-Marseille University
Universities and colleges in Aix-en-Provence
Universities and colleges in Marseille
1409 establishments in Europe
1400s establishments in France
2012 disestablishments in France
Educational institutions established in the 15th century
Educational institutions disestablished in 2012